Edith "Didi" Conn (née Bernstein; born July 13, 1951) is an American actress. She is best known for her work as Frenchy in Grease, Denise Stevens Downey in Benson and Stacy Jones in Shining Time Station.

Early life
Edith Bernstein was born on July 13, 1951, in Brooklyn, New York. She had a Conservative "holiday Jewish" upbringing, and is the daughter of a clinical psychologist; "Didi" was her childhood nickname. She attended Midwood High School. Her brother is opera singer Richard Bernstein.

Career
Conn made her debut as an actress in the 1960s. Her notable characters since the 1970s, when she first became prominent, include Laurie Robinson in You Light Up My Life (1977; Kasey Cisyk provided the character's singing voice), Frenchy in the feature films Grease (1978) and Grease 2 (1982), Helen on The Practice (1976–77), Denise Stevens Downey on Benson (1981–84), and Stacy Jones on Shining Time Station (1989–95).

Conn provided the voice for Raggedy Ann in the animated feature Raggedy Ann & Andy: A Musical Adventure (1977) directed by Richard Williams. She appeared as a celebrity guest on game shows like Match Game, The $20,000, $25,000, $50,000, and $100,000 Pyramids, Whew!, Chain Reaction, and Go.

As a theatre actress, she was involved with Broadway productions of Lost in Yonkers (1991), The Green Bird (2000), and Say Goodnight, Gracie (2002). In 2014 she performed in The Underpants in Hartford, Connecticut. She also starred in Dan Clancy's play Middletown from 2019 until 2021.

In January 2016, she had a cameo as Vi in the Grease: Live television special on Fox, thus being the only actress to appear in all three screen adaptations of the franchise. In addition, she has appeared in numerous other roles on television.

In 2019, Conn was a contestant on the eleventh series of the British television series Dancing on Ice. At 67, she was the oldest person ever to compete on the show. She, alongside her professional partner Łukasz Różycki, were eliminated in Week 4, after the judges saved Saara Aalto and Hamish Gaman in the skate-off.

Activism
Conn's adopted son Daniel is autistic. On November 13, 2008, she was named national celebrity spokesperson for Autism Speaks. Before that, she was a spokesperson for the National Alliance for Autism Research, now part of Autism Speaks. She has performed at benefits for Foundation for Educating Children with Autism (FECA).

On September 27, 2008, Conn performed with David Shire and Lynne Wintersteller at a benefit performance for Barack Obama in Nyack, New York.

Personal life
She married her first husband, Frank Conn, in 1975 and they divorced in 1978. She has been married to composer David Shire since 1984. Conn is the stepmother of Matthew Shire, a Los Angeles screenwriter and the son of Talia Shire, David's first wife.

Filmography

Film

Television

References

External links

1951 births
Living people
20th-century American actresses
20th-century American Jews
21st-century American actresses
21st-century American Jews
Actresses from New York City
American film actresses
American stage actresses
American television actresses
American voice actresses
Autism activists
Jewish American actresses
Midwood High School alumni
People from Midwood, Brooklyn